Dennis Sutton Horn (1909 – 1974) was an English male track cyclist.

Cycling career
In the early 1920s Dennis and his older brother Cyril took up cycling, Cyril had represented Great Britain at two Olympic Games as a speed skater. Dennis became British champion when winning the British National Tandem Sprint Championships with John Sibbit in 1932. He later won an individual title, winning the Sprint Championship at the 1938 British National Track Championships.

Dennis featured in a cigarette card published by Senior Service cigarettes (J. A. Pattreiouex Ltd) in 1935.  It was no. 25 of a set of 96 entitled Sporting Events and Stars.They raced for Norwich ABC (Amateur Bicycle Club).

References

1909 births
1974 deaths
British male cyclists
British track cyclists
Sportspeople from Norfolk
People from Upwell